Frank Peters may refer to:

 Frank Peters (baseball) (1894–?), American baseball player
 Frank Peters (ice hockey) (1902–1973), professional ice hockey player
 Frank Peters (footballer) (1910–1990), former English football player
 Frank Peters (college president) (1920–1987), second president of Wilfrid Laurier University
 Frank Peters Jr. (1930–2007), American Pulitzer Prize-winning journalist
 Frank Peters (American football) (born 1947), American football player

See also
Frank Peeters (born 1947), Belgian fine art photographer
Francis Peters (disambiguation)